Acacia sclerophylla, commonly known as the hard-leaf wattle, is a shrub of the genus Acacia and the subgenus Plurinerves and is endemic to southern parts of Australia.

Description
It has glossy green phyllodes with an oblanceolate shape and are slightly sticky. It blooms from August to October and produces yellow flowers. The golden-yellow spherical flowers are prolifically produced in the leaf axils.

Taxonomy
The species was first formally described by the botanist John Lindley in 1838 as part of Thomas Mitchell's work Three Expeditions into the interior of Eastern Australia. It was briefly reclassified as Racosperma sclerophyllum by Leslie Pedley in 2003 then transferred back to the genus Acacia in 2006.

There are three known varieties:
 Acacia sclerophylla var. pilosa
 Acacia sclerophylla var. sclerophylla
 Acacia sclerophylla var. teretiuscula

Distribution
It is native to southern areas in South Australia and Victoria as well as an area in the Wheatbelt  and Goldfields-Esperance regions of Western Australia. It is also found in south eastern parts of South Australia, eastern parts of Victoria and south eastern parts of New South Wales.

Cultivation
The hardy and attractive species are often used for hydroseeding on roadside that can grow in a variety of soils.

See also
List of Acacia species

References

sclerophylla
Acacias of Western Australia
Flora of South Australia
Flora of Victoria (Australia)
Taxa named by John Lindley
Flora of New South Wales
Plants described in 1838